Perihan Özkurt (born Perihan Benli; 18 March 1942 – 5 May 2016), best known as  Romalı Perihan, formerly Perihan, Princess of Esfandiari-Bakhtiari,  was an internationally known Turkish soprano, socialite, painter, model, columnist, and actress who was married to the late Iranian nobleman Bijan, Prince of Esfandiari-Bakhtiari in Italy.

Born and raised in Rome, Italy, Romalı Perihan was the sister-in-law of Her Majesty The Queen Soraya. She was once nicknamed "La Bella Turca" and "La Turca Romana" by the Italian media and was often referred to as Princess Romalı Perihan or Princess Soprano. Before pursuing a career as a singer at the age of seventeen, she briefly attended the Accademia Nazionale di Arte Drammatica Silvio D'Amico. She became one of the leading figures in European high society. Fluent in Italian and Turkish, Romalı Perihan spoke five languages.

Romalı Perihan was the Honorary President of the Cultural Foundation of Poets Ashiks and Writers. She acted in multilingual cinema chiefly from 1960 to 1982, doing several films in Italian with renowned director Federico Fellini, for whom she was a favourite subject. She is known as the only Turk to appear in a Fellini film. She also acted in films directed by such well-known artists as Antonio Margheriti, Dino De Laurentiis, Remzi Aydın Jöntürk, Roberto Bianchi Montero, Sergei Bondarchuk, Yılmaz Güney, and Zeki Alasya.

She should not be confused, as often happens, with the homonymous artists Peri-Han who was famous for her vamp roles and Perihan Tamer, a famous belly dancer. That is actually why Zeki Müren created the nickname "Romalı Perihan" (Turkish: Perihan of Rome), referring to Perihan's hometown, Rome. However, in the European media Romalı Perihan was sometimes credited as Peri-Han, Peri Han, and Pery Han.

She died aged 74 in Istanbul on 5 May 2016. Özkurt was interred at Ayazağa Cemetery following the religious funeral service held at Bebek Mosque on 7 May.

Early life and career
Romalı Perihan was born Perihan Benli to well-educated Turkish parents in Rome, Italy. Her mother, whose roots trace back to Rumelia, was an alumna of Boğaziçi University. Her maternal uncle was an admiral. Her father was from Bursa. She had two siblings.

When she was fourteen years old, she appeared for the first time on film, as the daughter of the protagonist in an Egyptian film shot in Cairo where she met Omar Sharif. Her manager then was Valentina Sturra. Two years later, she married the 33-year-old Bijan, Prince Esfandiari-Bakhtiari (15 October 1937, Isfahan – 29 October 2001, Paris) who was the second and youngest child of Prince Khalil Khan Esfandiary (1901–1983), a Bakhtiari nobleman and Iranian ambassador to West Germany in the 1950s, and his Russian-born German wife Princess Eva "Evchen" Karl (1906–1994).

As a result of her polyglotism and eclectic, wide-ranging repertoire of contemporary and narrative songs in Italian and Turkish, Perihan, in her mid-twenties, performed periodically as a soloist in Asım İslamoğlu and Fahrettin Aslan's several different luxurious locations featuring Turkey's most prominent artists, including Zeki Müren. During this period, Magali Noël was amongst the singers to join her on stage. In 2000s, Romalı Perihan also performed in notable clubs such as Cahide and Halikarnas. She also gave a concert in Supper Club, Ortaköy. Staged in support of her classical LP recordings and comprising a set list of songs from that and some other albums, she wore a US$27,000 costume called "Khurram Sultana" (surrounded by a double row of 72 black pearls from Singapore) during the event.

She had many uncredited roles for the first several years of her Cinecittà career. Her first role in Italia was in 1960's La dolce vita, and she would be featured in several movies into the 1950s; of these films, the most notable being Waterloo in 1970.

In the late 1970s, she was known for singing arrangements, most notably "O Bendim O" which is a cover of the Pierre Bachelet song "Histoire d'O". Turkish lyrics were written by Ülkü Aker. Produced by Nino Varon and arranged by Onno Tunç, "O Bendim O" was released through Kervan Plakçılık, in association with Nova Stereo, in 1976. Her LP Romalı Perihan'ın Arabesk Dünyası was released by Polat Tezel and was a commercial success.

In 1978, she was cast in the film Kaplanlar Ağlamaz, in which she shared the leading role with Cüneyt Arkın.

Romalı Perihan's second husband was Erdem Mısırlı, Turkish businessman and founder of the Mısırlı Triko brand.

In 1990, Federico Fellini wanted her cast in the leading role in his then-upcoming film La voce della luna; however, she regretfully refused since she was busy with wedding preparations in Germany. Her third and last husband was B. Bensan, who was a German engineer of Mercedes-Benz. The couple lived in Stuttgart, Baden-Württemberg, Germany, and their marriage lasted fourteen years.

Romalı Perihan was a very close friend of Ülkü Adatepe, one of the eight adopted children of Mustafa Kemal Atatürk who is the founder of the Republic of Turkey. Adatepe died in 2012. Among Perihan's close companions were Erol Simavi, Geraldine Chaplin, Sakıp Sabancı, Novella Parigini, and Yılmaz Güney.

Discography

LP recordings
 O Bendim O: O'nun Hikâyesi (Nova Stereo, 1976) (writer(s), Pierre Bachelet, Ülkü Aker)
 Görünce Seni (writer (s), Consuelo Velázquez, et al.)
 Nerden Nereye (writer (s), Las Grecas, et al.)
 Vay Başıma Gelenler (writer (s), Robert "Bob" Marcucci, Peter de Angelis, et al.)
 Romalı Perihan'ın Arabesk Dünyası "Gitme Sana Muhtacım"
 "Senin Olmaya Geldim"

Compilations featuring Romalı Perihan
 Bir Zamanlar 4...'' (Ossi Music, 2008) (With the song "Histoire d'O")

Filmography

Film and television

Special guest appearances

Awards and nominations

References

External links

 

1942 births
2016 deaths
Iranian nobility
Italian people of Turkish descent
Italian operatic sopranos
Singers from Istanbul
Musicians from Rome
Turkish film actresses
Turkish female models
Turkish women singers
Turkish television actresses
Turkish socialites